Karl G. Johnson is an American neuroscientist and developmental biologist who studies the development of the nervous system. He is the Sarah Rempel and Herbert S. Rempel Professor of Neuroscience at Pomona College in Claremont, California.

References

External links
Faculty page at Pomona College
The Johnson Lab website

Year of birth missing (living people)
Living people
Pomona College faculty
American neuroscientists
Developmental biologists
21st-century American biologists
20th-century American biologists
Alumni of the University of Cambridge
University of California, San Diego alumni
Grinnell College alumni
Harvard Medical School people